Nick Kuiper (born February 12, 1982) is a Canadian former professional ice hockey defenceman.

Playing career
Kuiper began his professional career in 2004 after signing for the Chicago Blackhawks from the University of Massachusetts Amherst. Kuiper was assigned to the Blackhawks affiliate the Norfolk Admirals of the American Hockey League where he spent two seasons.

In 2006–07, Kuiper played for five different teams, beginning the season in the AHL for the Manitoba Moose and played just two games, after that he moved to the Portland Pirates in the same league and played just seven games.  He then moved to the ECHL for the Augusta Lynx for 33 games, then moved back to the AHL with the Springfield Falcons for 18 games and then went back to the ECHL to play for the Johnstown Chiefs for their brief playoff run.

In 2007–08 Kuiper played for European teams, Ässät of the Finnish SM-liiga and Luleå HF of the Swedish SEL. In 2008–09 Kuiper signed with Austrian team Graz 99ers of the Austrian Hockey League. After scoring 6 goals in 53 games Kuiper signed a one-year contract extension  on July 15, 2009.

Kuiper has signed for the Belfast Giants of the Elite Ice Hockey League in the United Kingdom for the 2011-12 season.

Kuiper signed a one-year contract with the Friesland Flyers of the Eredivisie on July 29, 2013.

Awards
2001–02: HE All-Tournament Team
2011-12: EIHL Champion (Belfast Giants)

Career statistics

References

External links

1982 births
Ässät players
Augusta Lynx players
Belfast Giants players
Canadian ice hockey defencemen
Graz 99ers players
Johnstown Chiefs players
Living people
Manitoba Moose players
Norfolk Admirals players
People from Beaconsfield, Quebec
Portland Pirates players
Springfield Falcons players
UMass Minutemen ice hockey players
Canadian expatriate ice hockey players in Sweden
Canadian expatriate ice hockey players in Austria
Canadian expatriate ice hockey players in Finland
Canadian expatriate ice hockey players in the United States
Canadian expatriate ice hockey players in Italy
Canadian expatriate ice hockey players in the Netherlands
Canadian expatriate ice hockey players in Northern Ireland
Canadian people of Dutch descent